Qarahchi Bolagh (also Romanized as Qarahchī Bolāgh; also known as Qarahchah Bolāgh) is a village in Chaldoran-e Jonubi Rural District, in the Central District of Chaldoran County, West Azerbaijan Province, Iran. At the 2006 census, its population was 112, in 19 families.

References 

Populated places in Chaldoran County